Jomvu is a constituency in Kenya. It is one of six constituencies in Mombasa County. It was curved out of Changamwe Constituency after the promulgation of the New Constitution in 2010.

Members of Parliament

References 

Constituencies in Mombasa County